Jake Gerardo Beckford Edwards (born 31 July 1994) is a Costa Rican professional footballer who plays as a midfielder for Pérez Zeledón.

Club career
Born in Costa Rica, Beckford made his debut for the Carolina Railhawks of the North American Soccer League on June 29, 2013 against the Atlanta Silverbacks in which he came on in the 88th minute for César Elizondo as Carolina drew the match 1–1. Just before his debut however, Beckford had already drawn a red card on June 8, 2013 in the Railhawks 2–1 victory over the Tampa Bay Rowdies in which he was red carded in the 96th minute, along with Tampa Bay player, Shane Hill, despite not coming off the bench in that game after there was a mini-brawl on the pitch when the match ended.

In June 2014, Beckford joined Limón.

International
Beckford has represented his country at the under-17 for Costa Rica during the 2011 CONCACAF U-17 Championship.

Career statistics

References

External links 
 Carolina Railhawks Profile

1994 births
Living people
Association football midfielders
Costa Rican footballers
A.D. San Carlos footballers
L.D. Alajuelense footballers
C.F. Universidad de Costa Rica footballers
Municipal Pérez Zeledón footballers
North Carolina FC players
Liga FPD players
North American Soccer League players
Costa Rican expatriate footballers
Expatriate soccer players in the United States
Place of birth missing (living people)
Costa Rica youth international footballers
Costa Rican expatriate sportspeople in the United States